Putna can refer to the following places in Romania:

 Putna, Suceava, a commune in Suceava County
 Putna, a village in Prigor Commune, Caraș-Severin County
 Putna, a village in Bolotești Commune, Vrancea County
 Putna Seacă, a village in Garoafa Commune, Vrancea County
 Putna Monastery, in Suceava County
 Putna County, a former county in the interwar Romania, now part of Vrancea County
 Putna (Bistricioara), tributary of the Bistricioara (Siret basin) in Harghita County
 Putna (Moldova), tributary of the Moldova in Suceava County
 Putna, another name for the river Prigor in Caraș-Severin County
 Putna (Siret), tributary of the Siret in Vrancea County
 Putna (Suceava), tributary of the Suceava in Suceava County
 Putna, alternative name of the upper reach of the river Borzontul Mare

See also
 Putna (surname)